The 5th Congress of the Workers' Party of Korea took place from 2–13 November 1970.

At the time there were 1.6 million Party members, around 13% of the population. 1,734 of them attended the Congress. During the 5th Congress of the Workers' Party of Korea, Kim Il-sung delivered a report setting the "three revolutions" (ideological, technological and cultural revolutions) as well as the "Six-Year National Economic Plan (1971-1976)".

The WPK 5th Central Committee held 19 plenary meetings from 1970 to 1980. The 1st Plenum on 13 November 1970 appointed Kim Il-sung as General Secretary, a 15-member Political Committee and a 9-member Secretariat. The 8th Plenum in February 1974 designated Kim Jong-il as Kim Il-sung's successor.

It was announced that the Seven Year Plan was accomplished and a new Six-Year Plan was about to be announced. The new Central Committee consisted of 117 full (voting) members and 55 alternate (candidate) members. The Politburo was reduced from 29 (according to the Second Party Conference) to 15 members, of them 11 were full (voting) and 4 alternate (candidates). Also, 10 secretaries of the Central Committee coordinating various aspects of the CC activity were appointed, including Kim Il-sung.

"three revolutions"
Three revolutions, or Samdaehyokmyong(三大革命) was first proclaimed in this congress. The revolutions were classified into three aspects: ideological revolutions, technological revolutions, and cultural revolutions.The revolutions were also defined as a continuous revolution that needs to be done until complete communist society is achieved.

Three technological revolutions
Three technological revolutions(3대기술혁명, 三大技術革命) was a term that outlined three tasks to mechanize and automate the North Korean technology.The three tasks were firstly eliminating the differentiation between heavy labor and light labor, secondly,elimination of differentation between factory labor and agricultural work, and lastly, helping woman escape from demanding work at home.

Three ideological revolutions
Ideological revolution constituted of activities to make people into an individual that is fit for the communist society,and organizational activities and ideological education were suggested as methods to achieve that goal.

Three cultural revolutions
Cultural revolution was described as "activities of establishing a socialist culture",The aim was often done by organizing small groups(sojo,소조,小組) of "three revolutions'. The first "three revolutions small group movement(삼대혁명소조운동)" was conducted in 1973.Another movement called "three revolutions red flag winning movement(삼대혁명붉은기쟁취운동)" started in 1975,which constituted of organizing competitions of different people in the north korean public to achieve set goals that the North Korean society requires.North korean authorities claim that these movements led to the early achievement of the aims set in the Six-Year National Economic Plan (1971-1976).

5th Central Guidance Bodies

First plenary session
The Central Committee ranking list:
Kim Il-sung
Choe Yong-gon
Kim Il
Pak Song-chol
Choe Hyon
Kim Yong-ju
O Chin-u
Kim Tong-gyu
So Chol
Kim Chung-nin
Han Ik-su
Hyon Mu-gwang
Chong Chun-taek
Yang Hyong-sop
Kim Man-gum
Nam Il
Choe Yong-jin
Hong Won-gil
Chong Kyong-hui
Kim Yo-jung

Plenums of the 5th Central Committee
 1st plenary session (13 November 1970)
 2nd enlarged plenary session (19-23 April 1971)
 3rd plenary session (15-22 November 1971)
 4th plenary session (1-6 July 1972)
 5th plenary session (23-26 October 1972)
 6th plenary session (22 December 1972)
 7th plenary session (4-17 September 1973)
 8th plenary session (11-13 February 1974)
 9th plenary session (1974)
 10th plenary session (11-17 February 1975)
 11th plenary session (19-21 November 1975)
 12th plenary session (11-14 October 1976)
 13th plenary session (4-6 April 1977)
 14th plenary session (5-7 September 1977)
 15th plenary session (13 December 1977)
 16th plenary session (28 January 1978)
 17th plenary session (27 November 1978)
 18th plenary session (13-15 June 1979)
 19th plenary session (10-12 December 1979)

References

1970 in North Korea
1970 conferences
Congresses of the Workers' Party of Korea